The following Union Army units and commanders fought in the Battle of Fort Stevens of the American Civil War on July 11–12, 1864. The Confederate order of battle is listed separately.

Abbreviations used

Military rank
 MG = Major General
 BG = Brigadier General
 Col = Colonel
 Ltc = Lieutenant Colonel
 Maj = Major
 Cpt = Captain

Other
 w = wounded
 k = killed

Defenses of the Potomac River & Washington
MG Alexander McDowell McCook
 Chief of Engineers: Ltc Barton Stone Alexander
 Aide-de-Camp: Col Norton Parker Chipman

VI Corps
MG Horatio G. Wright

XIX Corps (Detachment)
MG Quincy A. Gillmore

XXII Corps and Department of Washington

MG Christopher C. Augur

Front Line Commanders
In addition to their own commands these officers supervised a section of Washington's fortifications during the battle.

References
Eicher, John H., & Eicher, David J., Civil War High Commands, Stanford University Press, 2001, .

American Civil War orders of battle
Valley campaigns of 1864